Channel 48 refers to several television stations:

Canada
The following television stations broadcast on digital channel 48 (UHF frequencies covering 675.25-679.75 MHz) in Canada:
 CFMT-DT-1 in London, Ontario
 CJCH-DT in Halifax, Nova Scotia

See also
 Channel 48 TV stations in Mexico
 Channel 48 digital TV stations in the United States
 Channel 48 virtual TV stations in the United States
 Channel 48 low-power TV stations in the United States

48